Quint or Quints may refer to:


In music
 A type of sackbut, a musical instrument 
 A free-bass system for the accordion invented by Willard Palmer
 A type of pipe organ stop

Vehicles
 Honda Quint, a subcompact car manufactured by Honda of Japan
 Quint (fire apparatus), a fire service apparatus combining features of an engine and a ladder truck
 A tandem bicycle with five seats

People and fictional characters
 Quint (name), a list of people and characters with the surname or given name

Other uses
 NATO Quint, an informal decision-making group consisting of the EU big four and the United States
 Quint-, a numerical prefix meaning five
 A component of a graphical GUI scroll bar widget
 Quintuplets, born as part of a multiple birth with five children
 Quints (film), a 2000 Disney Channel movie
The Quint, an India based news portal

See also